Platysteiridae is a family of small, stout passerine birds of the African tropics. The family contains the wattle-eyes, batises and shrike-flycatchers. They were previously classed as a subfamily of the Old World flycatchers, Muscicapidae. These insect-eating birds are usually found in open forests or bush. They hunt by flycatching, or by taking prey from the ground like a shrike. The nest is a small, neat cup, placed low in a tree or bush.

Distribution and habitat
The Platysteiridae are arboreal birds, primarily of the woodlands and forests of sub-Saharan Africa. The family is restricted to mainland Africa and its offshore islands. The shrike-flycatchers and genus Dyaphorophyia are inhabitants of dense forest, while the rest of the wattle-eyes are found in woodland, and the batises range across all wooded habitats except the densest forests of the Congo Basin. The pririt and pygmy batis survive in very arid environments with some cover, and the white-fronted wattle-eye favours mangrove forests in Angola. Many species in the family have adapted to human-altered habitats. The family has its highest diversity at equatorial latitudes, with half the known species native to Tanzania and almost half also ranging into the DRC and Kenya.

The family is overwhelmingly sedentary. However, there are a few exceptions; the African shrike-flycatcher is probably an intra-African migrant, as it is seasonally absent from parts of its range. In addition, some batis species undertake seasonal migrations, besides some local movements in response to changing local conditions.

Morphology

The Platysteiridae are small to medium-sized passerines. They have short legs and an upright stance while perched. The tail length is variable, with the Dyaphorophyia wattle-eyes and batises having short tails and the Platysteria wattle-eyes and shrike-flycatchers possessing longish tails. The bill is flat and hooked at the tip, and generally wide with well-developed rictal bristles. With the exception of a few batises, the plumage of the family is sexually dimorphic. Overall the family has white undersides and dark, speckled upperparts, with many species sporting a band across the chest. A few wattle-eyes depart from this pattern and possess brightly coloured plumage. The plumage on the back of some genera are erectile, giving the family the alternative name of puffback flycatchers. The irides of batises and the black-and-white shrike-flycatcher are brightly coloured and used in communication, becoming more brightly coloured when the adults are excited. In the wattle-eyes the supra-orbital wattles above the eyes, for which they are named, are used in communication. In addition the family is highly vocal, with a repertoire that includes a range of whistles, harsh calls and duets.

Diet
The most important component in the diet of all species is insects, although spiders, millipedes and scorpions are also taken, and there are even records of small lizards being consumed. Amongst the insect prey, a number of different types are eaten: beetles, grasshoppers and other Orthoptera, flies, mosquitoes, wasps, termites, mantises and others. Members of this family forage either individually or in family groups. Some species will also join mixed species feeding flocks, which confers some foraging advantages. The different species and genera use a variety of methods to obtain prey, ranging from foliage-gleaning to flycatching.

Conservation and threats
One species, the banded wattle-eye, is considered threatened by human activities. The species has a restricted range in Cameroon which is vulnerable to forest clearance, and it is listed as endangered by the IUCN. Two other species are considered near-threatened, the Gabon batis and the white-fronted wattle-eye; both species are threatened by habitat loss. Some species are also very poorly known, and one species, the dark batis, was only identified as a species in 2006.

Platysteiridae
 Genus Batis
 Cape batis, Batis capensis
 Malawi batis, Batis dimoprha
 Forest batis, Batis mixta
 Dark batis, Batis crypta
 Woodwards's batis, Batis fratrum
 Margaret's batis, Batis margaritae
 Rwenzori batis, Batis diops
 Fernando Po batis, Batis poensis
 West African batis, Batis occulta
 Angola batis, Batis minulla
 Gabon batis, Batis minima
 Ituri batis, Batis ituriensis
 Senegal batis, Batis senegalensis
 Grey-headed batis, Batis orientalis
 Chinspot batis, Batis molitor
 Pale batis, Batis soror
 Pririt batis, Batis pririt
 Eastern black-headed batis, Batis minor
 Western black-headed batis, Batis erlangeri
 Pygmy batis, Batis perkeo
 Genus Platysteira
 Black-throated wattle-eye, Platysteira peltata
 Black-necked wattle-eye, Platysteira chalybea
 Banded wattle-eye, Platysteira laticincta
 Chestnut wattle-eye, Platysteira castanea
 West African wattle-eye, Platysteira hormophora
 Brown-throated wattle-eye, Platysteira cyanea
 Jameson's wattle-eye, Platysteira jamesoni
 Red-cheeked wattle-eye, latysteira blissetti
 White-fronted wattle-eye, Platysteira albifrons
 White-spotted wattle-eye, Platysteira tonsa
 Yellow-bellied wattle-eye, Platysteira concreta
 Genus Lanioturdus
White-tailed shrike, Lanioturdus torquatus, is usually considered to be part of the family, sometimes considered belonging with bushshrikes (Malaconotidae).

References

Del Hoyo, J.; Elliot, A. & Christie D. (editors). (2006). Handbook of the Birds of the World. Volume 11: Old World Flycatchers to Old World Warblers. Lynx Edicions. .

External links
Internet Bird Collection.com: Wattle-eye videos